The 2018 Cornell Big Red football team represented Cornell University in the 2018 NCAA Division I FCS football season as a member of the Ivy League. They were led by sixth-year head coach David Archer and played their home games at Schoellkopf Field. Cornell finished the season 3–7 overall 2–5 in Ivy League play to place seventh. Cornell averaged 6,601 fans per game.

Previous season
The Big Red finished the 2017 season 3–7, 3–4 in Ivy League play, to finish tied for fifth place.

Schedule
The 2018 schedule consisted of five home and five away games. The Big Red hosted Ivy League foes Yale, Harvard, Penn, and Dartmouth, and traveled to Brown, Princeton, and Columbia.

In 2018, Cornell's non-conference opponents were Delaware of the Colonial Athletic Association, Sacred Heart of the Northeast Conference, and Colgate of the Patriot League. Homecoming coincided with the home opener against Yale on September 22.

Cornell's 66–0 loss to Princeton on October 27 was its worst defeat since a 77–0 defeat by Harvard in 1890, 128 years earlier.

Game summaries

at Delaware

Yale

Sacred Heart

Harvard

at Colgate

at Brown

at Princeton

Penn

Dartmouth

at Columbia

References

Cornell
Cornell Big Red football seasons
Cornell Big Red football